Aphonopelma parvum is a species of spiders in the family Theraphosidae, found in United States (Arizona and New Mexico).

References

parvum
Spiders described in 2016
Spiders of the United States
Natural history of Arizona
Natural history of New Mexico